Tiefland may refer to:
 Tiefland (opera) a 1903 opera by Eugen d'Albert
 Tiefland (film), a 1954 film by Leni Riefenstahl
 , a Hansa A Type cargo ship in service 1943-45